Dale A. Liston is a retired American football coach.  He served as the head coach at Friends University in Wichita, Kansas (1979–1984), Thiel College in Greenville, Pennsylvania (1988–1991), and Manchester University in North Manchester, Indiana (1992–1994).

Head coaching record

References

Year of birth missing (living people)
Living people
Akron Zips football coaches
Friends Falcons football coaches
Manchester Spartans football coaches
Thiel Tomcats athletic directors
Thiel Tomcats football coaches